Carlwyn Reid (12 May 1881 – 15 July 1932) was a cricketer. He played in six first-class matches for British Guiana from 1903 to 1911.

See also
 List of Guyanese representative cricketers

References

External links
 

1881 births
1932 deaths
Cricketers from British Guiana

Sportspeople from Georgetown, Guyana